Elise Pone is an American Muay Thai fighter and mixed martial artist who competes in the Flyweight division of Invicta FC.

Early life 
Pone was born in State College, Pennsylvania and went to State College Area High School.

Mixed martial arts career

History 
Pone started her training in martial arts at the age of 12 in Muay Thai and catch wrestling.  Her instructors as a child included Bill Gebhardt of the State College Martial Arts Academy and her mother, Barbra Macus.  Pone now trains out of Central PA Mixed Martial Arts in State College, PA and trains under Ryan Gruhn.

Invicta Fighting Championships 
In December 2020 Pone signed with Invicta FC and made her American debut at Invicta FC 44: Rodríguez vs. Torquato against Chrissy Yandolli and won via TKO at 2:07 in the second round.  Pone secured the only TKO/KO finish of the night.

Pone faced Helen Peralta on January 12, 2022, at Invicta FC 45. She lost the bout via unanimous decision.

Pone faced Melissa Oddessa Parker on November 16, 2022 at Invicta FC 50, winning via unanimous decision.

Muay Thai 
Pone holds an overall Muay Thai/Kickboxing record of 16-1 fighting in the USKA, Tournament of Champions and the TBA Classic Tournaments.  She has won titles in C Class, B Class and A Class and is undefeated in the USKA and Tournament of Champions.  Her only loss came in 2016 to Kaitlin Stein which she avenged the following year with a unanimous decision over Stein.  Pone took three years off from Muay Thai competition from 2017 to 2021 and won the TBA Classic in 2021 with two (T)KO finishes and 2022 with two (T)KO finishes and one Unanimous Decision.  She was also presented with the "Best Nak Muay" award at the TBA Classic for 2021 and 2022.  She currently holds 6 title belts across two different weight classes and two different organizations.  She is the current North American Champion for the TBA Classic at 127lbs and currently holds the record for title belts for a female in the organization.

Mixed martial arts record 

|-
|Win
| align=center|2–1 
| Melissa Oddessa Parker
| Decision (unanimous)
|Invicta FC 50
|
|align=center|3
|align=center|5:00
|Denver, Colorado, United States
|
|-
|Loss
| align=center|1–1 
| Helen Peralta
| Decision (unanimous)
| Invicta FC 45
| 
| align=center| 3
| align=center| 5:00
| Kansas City, Kansas, United States
|
|-
|Win
|align=center|1–0
|Chrissy Yandolli
|TKO (punches)
|Invicta FC on AXS TV: Rodríguez vs. Torquato
|
|align=center|2
|align=center|2:07
|Kansas City, Kansas, United States
|
|-

Titles

Muay Thai
 Tournament of Champions 
 2021 Tournament of Champions Light Weight (−60 kg/132 lb) Championship
 2016 Tournament of Champions Light Weight (−60 kg/132 lb) Championship
 TBA Classic
 2022 TBA Classic Feather Weight (−57.7 kg/127 lb) Championship
 2021 TBA Classic Feather Weight (−57.7 kg/127 lb) Championship
 2018 TBA Classic Feather Weight (−57.7 kg/127 lb) Championship
 2017 TBA Classic Feather Weight (−57.7 kg/127 lb) Championship

Awards

Muay Thai
 2022 Best Nak Muay by TBA Classic
 2021 Best Nak Muay by TBA Classic

Muay Thai record

|-
! colspan="9" style="background:white"|
|- style="background:#cfc;"
|
| style="text-align:center;" |Win
| style="text-align:left" |  Morgane Mary-Pouliot
|TBA Classic
| style="text-align:left" |  Des Moines, IA
| style="text-align:center;" |Unanimous Decision
| align="center" |3
| align="center" |N/A
| style="text-align:center;" |16-1
|-
|-
|- style="background:#cfc;"
|
| style="text-align:center;" |Win
| style="text-align:left" |  Angela Thomai
|TBA Classic
| style="text-align:left" |  Des Moines, IA
| style="text-align:center;" |TKO
| align="center" |2
| align="center" |N/A
| style="text-align:center;" |15-1
|-
|-
|- style="background:#cfc;"
|
| style="text-align:center;" |Win
| style="text-align:left" |  Sarah Szymanski
|TBA Classic
| style="text-align:left" |  Des Moines, IA
| style="text-align:center;" |TKO
| align="center" |1
| align="center" |N/A
| style="text-align:center;" |14-1
|-
|-
! colspan="9" style="background:white"|
|- style="background:#cfc;"
|
| style="text-align:center;" |Win
| style="text-align:left" |  Josie Yelle
|Tournament of Champions 
| style="text-align:left" |  Des Moines, IA
| style="text-align:center;" |TKO
| align="center" |5
| align="center" |N/A
| style="text-align:center;" |13-1
|-
|-
|- style="background:#cfc;"
|
| style="text-align:center;" |Win
| style="text-align:left" |  Alexandra Lopez
|Tournament of Champions
| style="text-align:left" |  Des Moines, IA
| style="text-align:center;" |Unanimous Decision
| align="center" |3
| align="center" |N/A
| style="text-align:center;" |12-1
|-
|-
! colspan="9" style="background:white"|
|- style="background:#cfc;"
|
| style="text-align:center;" |Win
| style="text-align:left" |  Josephine Lidberg 
|TBA Classic
| style="text-align:left" |  Des Moines, IA
| style="text-align:center;" |TKO
| align="center" |2
| align="center" |N/A
| style="text-align:center;" |11-1
|-|-
|- style="background:#cfc;"
|
| style="text-align:center;" |Win
| style="text-align:left" |  Brittney Bowman 
|TBA Classic
| style="text-align:left" |  Des Moines, IA
| style="text-align:center;" |KO
| align="center" |3
| align="center" |N/A
| style="text-align:center;" |10-1
|-
! colspan="9" style="background:white"|
|-|- style="background:#cfc;"
|
| style="text-align:center;" |Win
| style="text-align:left" |  Kelsie Kidder 
|TBA Classic
| style="text-align:left" |  Des Moines, IA
| style="text-align:center;" |Unanimous Decision
| align="center" |3
| align="center" |N/A
| style="text-align:center;" |9–1
|-
|-
|-
|-
|- style="background:#cfc;"
|
| style="text-align:center;" |Win
| style="text-align:left" |  Ellen Motsch 
|TBA Classic
| style="text-align:left" |  Des Moines, IA
| style="text-align:center;" |Unanimous Decision
| align="center" |3
| align="center" |N/A
| style="text-align:center;" |8–1
|-
|-
! colspan="9" style="background:white" |
|-
|-
|- style="background:#cfc;"
|
| style="text-align:center;" |Win
| style="text-align:left" |  Kaitlin Stein
|TBA Classic
| style="text-align:left" |  Des Moines, IA
| style="text-align:center;" |Unanimous Decision
| align="center" |3
| align="center" |N/A
| style="text-align:center;" |7–1
|- style="background:#cfc;"
|
| style="text-align:center;" |Win
| style="text-align:left" |  Jackie Bean
|TBA Classic
| style="text-align:left" |  Des Moines, IA
| style="text-align:center;" |Unanimous Decision
| align="center" |3
| align="center" |N/A
| style="text-align:center;" |6–1
|- style="background:#cfc;"
|
| style="text-align:center;" |Win
| style="text-align:left" |  Victoria Andreev
|TBA Classic
| style="text-align:left" |  Des Moines, IA
| style="text-align:center;" |Unanimous Decision
| align="center" |3
| align="center" |N/A
| style="text-align:center;" |5–1
|-
! colspan="9" style="background:white"|
|- style="background:#cfc;"
|
| style="text-align:center;" |Win
| style="text-align:left" |  Danielle Rind
|Tournament of Champions
| style="text-align:left" |  Kansas City, Missouri
| style="text-align:center;" |Unanimous Decision
| align="center" |3
| align="center" |N/A
| style="text-align:center;" |4–1
|- style="background:#fbb;"
|
| style="text-align:center;" |Loss
| style="text-align:left" |  Kaitlin Stein
|TBA Classic
| style="text-align:left" |  Des Moines, IA
| style="text-align:center;" |Split Decision
| align="center" |3
| align="center" |N/A
| style="text-align:center;" |3-1
|- style="background:#cfc;"
|
| style="text-align:center;" |Win
| style="text-align:left" |  Kelly Postlewait
|TBA Classic
| style="text-align:left" |  Des Moines, IA
| style="text-align:center;" |Unanimous Decision
| align="center" |3
| align="center" |N/A
| style="text-align:center;" |3–0
|-
|- style="background:#cfc;"
|
| style="text-align:center;" |Win
| style="text-align:left" |  Amanda Witt
|USKA
| style="text-align:left" |  Hamburg, PA
| style="text-align:center;" |TKO
| align="center" |2
| align="center" |N/A
| style="text-align:center;" |2–0
|- style="background:#cfc;"
|
| style="text-align:center;" |Win
| style="text-align:left" |  Terri Johnston
|USKA
| style="text-align:left" |  Hamburg, PA
| style="text-align:center;" |Unanimous Decision
| align="center" |3
| align="center" |N/A
| style="text-align:center;" |1–0
|-
|-
| colspan=9 | Legend:

References 

1985 births
American female mixed martial artists
Living people
Flyweight mixed martial artists
Mixed martial artists utilizing Muay Thai
Mixed martial artists utilizing catch wrestling
Mixed martial artists utilizing Brazilian jiu-jitsu
American Muay Thai practitioners
Female Muay Thai practitioners
American female sport wrestlers
American catch wrestlers
American practitioners of Brazilian jiu-jitsu
Female Brazilian jiu-jitsu practitioners
21st-century American women